F-box protein 40 is a protein that in humans is encoded by the FBXO40 gene. Fbxo40 induces ubiquitination of IRS1, thus limiting activity of IGF1 signaling (Shi et al, 2011).

Function

Members of the F-box protein family, such as FBXO40, are characterized by an approximately 40-amino acid F-box motif. SCF complexes, formed by SKP1 (MIM 601434), cullin (see CUL1; MIM 603134), and F-box proteins, act as protein-ubiquitin ligases. F-box proteins interact with SKP1 through the F box, and they interact with ubiquitination targets through other protein interaction domains.

Fbxo40 in particular engages a unique substrate, IRS1, which is a protein in the IGF1 signaling pathway. In this way, Fbxo40 causes ubiquitination and degradation of IRS1, blocking further signaling downstream of the IGF1 receptor.

References